Casey Wasner (born 1983/1984) is an American singer, songwriter and musician from Northfield, Minnesota . He is the son of Craig and Linda Wasner who are also from southern Minnesota. Casey is one of many musicians in the Wasner family.

Early life 
Wasner was born in Northfield, Minnesota to Craig and Linda Wasner. As a child he had a passion for music. He is a 2001 graduate of Northfield High School. Eventually after graduating high school he became a drummer in Nashville, Tennessee.

Music career 
On February 21, 2013, Wasner debuted and released  his self-titled first album ‘Casey Wasner’ which consists of 11 songs. He continues to write music and go on tours in the southeastern United States.

References 

 https://www.grammy.com/grammys/artists/casey-wasner                                                                               
https://www.allmusic.com/artist/casey-wasner-mn0002079526/credits                                                  
http://www.southernminn.com/scene/music/article_90b423db-55c0-517c-a83d-bb5e91898a9a.html          
https://kymnradio.net/2017/10/27/casey-wasner/

Living people
Year of birth uncertain
People from Northfield, Minnesota
Singer-songwriters from Minnesota
American male singer-songwriters
Year of birth missing (living people)